The Independent Spirit Robert Altman Award is presented to the ensemble cast, director and casting director of a film by the Film Independent, a non-profit organization dedicated to independent film and independent filmmakers. It is named after director, screenwriter, and producer Robert Altman, who is considered a "maverick" in naturalistic films.

The award was created as a tribute after his passing during the 2007 ceremony, with Todd Haynes' musical drama film I'm Not There being the first recipient of the award. It became a competitive category the following year. Since its inauguration, the award was always directly given to the winner, without any other nominees.

Winners

See also
Screen Actors Guild Award for Outstanding Performance by a Cast in a Motion Picture
National Board of Review Award for Best Cast
Critics' Choice Movie Award for Best Acting Ensemble

References

R
Film awards for Best Cast
Awards established in 2007